These are the Billboard magazine R&B albums that reached number one in 1979.

Chart history

See also
1979 in music
R&B number-one hits of 1979 (USA)

1979